FNT may refer to:
 Bishop International Airport, in Flint, Michigan, United States
 Feniton railway station, in England
 Forbairt Naíonraí Teoranta, an Irish language educational organization
 Formate-nitrite transporter
 National Labour Front (Chile)